is a 2000 (copyright date) Japanese CG anime original video animation release. The OVA was written and directed by Shuhei Morita and produced by Sunrise. This story takes place in 2710, when a boy named Shinichi follows a white deer and meets a strange girl. It is licensed in North America by Sentai Filmworks, and was released alongside another Sunrise produced OVA Five Numbers! on DVD and Blu-ray on November 22, 2011.

Plot
In 2710, a boy named Shinichi is on a school field trip to a rebuilt 21st century version of the city Nara. When he wanders from his class, he spots a talking white deer and it steals his bag. Shinichi follows the deer and sees a strange girl named Toto and falls in love with her. She is being pursued by two brothers and they try to get away from them.

Characters

 A boy who sees the White Deer and meets Toto.

 A mysterious girl who is seen riding the White Deer. She is being chased by the two brothers.

 A strange talking deer who is white in color. He leads Shinichi to Toto.

 The president of a large company, she hires the brothers to capture Toto.

, 
, 
 Two brothers who were hired to capture Toto. The older brother wears a blue suit and the younger brother wears a yellow suit.

References

External links
 
 

2011 anime OVAs
Fiction set in the 28th century
Comedy anime and manga
Romance anime and manga
Science fiction anime and manga
Sentai Filmworks
Sunrise (company)
Single OVAs